Karoubi may refer to:

Max Karoubi Mathematician who introduced:
Karoubi conjecture
Karoubi envelope
Mehdi Karroubi Iranian politician